Richard Bertie (25 December 15169 April 1582) was an English landowner and religious evangelical. He was the second husband of Catherine Willoughby, 12th Baroness Willoughby de Eresby, Duchess Dowager of Suffolk and a woman whom Henry VIII was considering as his seventh wife shortly before his death; she also received a proposal from the King of Poland.

Life
Richard Bertie was from an unusually humble stock for the connections he made. He was the son of Thomas Bertie (ca. 1480-bef. 5 June 1555), Captain of Hurst Castle and a master mason, and Aline Say. His paternal grandfather Robert Bertie (died 1501/2) was also a stonemason at Bearsted, Kent, and was married to one Marion, by whom he had two more children, a daughter Joan Bertie and a son William Bertie, born after 1480. Richard matriculated at Corpus Christi College, Oxford, on 17 February 1533/1534 and succeeded his father in 1555.

He married Catherine Willoughby, the daughter and heiress of William, 11th Lord Willoughby, and widow of Charles Brandon, 1st Duke of Suffolk. The Berties had married for love around 1553, after Bertie had for several years served as her Master of the Horse and Gentleman Usher. The pair fled to the Continent during the reign of the Catholic Mary I and the Counter-Reformation. They ignored commands to return, and their estates were sequestered. They travelled first to Cleves and then Polish–Lithuanian Commonwealth. They returned in 1559 soon after the accession of the more Protestant Elizabeth I and had their lands restored to them. Their story is recorded in Foxe's Book of Martyrs.

Bertie was the father of Susan Bertie, Countess of Kent and Peregrine Bertie, 13th Baron Willoughby de Eresby, prominent Protestants during the reign of Elizabeth. Peregrine was named for their wandering life in exile.

Bertie was Member of Parliament (MP) for Lincolnshire from 1562 to 1567. In 1564 he attended the Queen in her visit to Cambridge University, and was granted an MA. In 1570 he unsuccessfully claimed the Barony Willoughby de Eresby in right of his wife.

He was appointed a Justice of the Peace for Lindsey by 1564 and High Sheriff of Lincolnshire for 1564–65.

He died at Bourne, Lincolnshire on 9 April 1582.

References

1510s births
1582 deaths
Year of birth unknown
English MPs 1563–1567
Richard
Willoughby family
16th-century Protestants
English Protestants
People from Lincolnshire
Marian exiles
16th-century English landowners
High Sheriffs of Lincolnshire
Year of birth uncertain
Alumni of Corpus Christi College, Oxford
English courtiers
Court of Henry VIII